Peter Maass (born 1960) is an American journalist and author.

Life and career
Maass was born in Los Angeles and graduated from the University of California, Berkeley. He has worked for The Wall Street Journal, The New York Times, The Washington Post, and The New York Times Magazine. He has mainly covered international stories and has lived in Belgium, South Korea, and Hungary. In 1996 he published his first book Love Thy Neighbor: A Story of War. It told of his experiences covering the conflict in Bosnia.

In 1996, Maass wrote an article for U.S. News & World Report which advocated liberalizing zoning laws to promote affordable housing for lower-income families. In the article he praised Jack Kemp for proposing this idea which was later rejected by both the George H. W. Bush and the Bill Clinton administrations.

Two years later, Maass reported on the Unification Church for The New Yorker.  He interviewed church members in Korea, the United States and South America, and was one of the few journalists ever permitted to attend church founder Sun Myung Moon's talks to church members.

In 2003, Maass covered the Iraq War and was noted for his relationship with Iraqi blogger Salam Pax. Later that year, Maass wrote a profile on North Korean leader Kim Jung Il for The New York Times Magazine which was praised for presenting information previously unknown in the English-speaking world.

In 2005, Forbes magazine called Maass the "Dunce of the Week" for a New York Times Magazine cover story which predicted higher oil prices due to increased demand and decreased supply. Forbes also suggested that he had a left-wing political bias in the way he wrote the story. Maass's story indirectly led to the Simmons–Tierney bet. However, despite the mockery from Forbes, Maass' prediction seemed to be fairly accurate as crude oil was at $92.37 per barrel in July 2005 when Maass wrote his magazine story, and by June 2008 it reached a peak of $190.68 per barrel.

On June 13, 2012, Maass received the first John M. Higgins Award for Best In-Depth/Enterprise Reporting.

Maass resided at the American Academy in Berlin as a fall 2009 Berlin Prize Fellow, where he worked on his book War of Icons: From Baghdad to Berlin, a Military Writer Looks at How Pictures Frame Wars. His newest book is Crude World: The Violent Twilight of Oil.

Personal life
He is married to journalist and author Alissa Quart. They live in New York City.

References

External links

Guest appearances on Charlie Rose's PBS program
Interview on National Public Radio
Peter Maass on Crude World: The Violent Twilight of Oil – video report by Democracy Now!

Living people
American male journalists
University of California, Berkeley alumni
American investigative journalists
Critics of the Unification Church
Berlin Prize recipients
1960 births